Sar Qaleh or Sar Ghaleh may refer to:

Chaharmahal and Bakhtiari Province
Sar Qaleh, Ardal, a village in Ardal County
Sar Qaleh, Lordegan, a village in Lordegan County
Sar Qaleh, Manj, a village in Lordegan County

Kermanshah Province
Sarqaleh Rural District, an administrative subdivision

Khuzestan Province
Sar Qaleh, Khuzestan, a village in Khuzestan Province
Sar Qaleh Palmi, a village in Khuzestan Province
Sar Qaleh-ye Ha, a village in Khuzestan Province
Sar Qaleh-ye Khalijan, a village in Khuzestan Province
Sar Qaleh Zivar, a village in Khuzestan Province

Kurdistan Province
Sar Qaleh, Kurdistan, a village in Divandarreh County

Lorestan Province
Sar Qaleh, Zaz-e Gharbi, a village in Lorestan Province
Sar Qaleh, Zaz-e Sharqi, a village in Lorestan Province
Sar Qaleh Sofla, a village in Lorestan Province